Kendrick Jones (born November 30, 1982 in East St. Louis, Illinois) is a former wide receiver who played for the BC Lions of the Canadian Football League. He signed as a free agent with BC on July 10, 2006. Jones appeared in 40 games (2002-2005) at the University of Illinois racking up 69 receptions for 983 yards and six touchdowns. His best season came as a junior in 2004 when he notched 47 catches for 687 yards and five touchdowns, good enough for seventh place among Big Ten receivers that season.

External links
Kendrick Jones at CFL.ca

1982 births
BC Lions players
American football wide receivers
Canadian football wide receivers
American players of Canadian football
Living people
Illinois Fighting Illini football players